Pachybrachis fuscipes is a species of case-bearing leaf beetle in the family Chrysomelidae. It is found in North America.

Subspecies
These two subspecies belong to the species Pachybrachis fuscipes:
 Pachybrachis fuscipes fuscipes Fall, 1915
 Pachybrachis fuscipes purgatus Fall, 1915

References

Further reading

 

fuscipes
Articles created by Qbugbot
Beetles described in 1915